Natella Vagifivna Krapivina (née Aliyeva; ; born 7 April 1982) is a Ukrainian producer and director who is best known for working extensively with Ukrainian singer LOBODA. Krapivina additionally produces the Ukrainian travel show Oryol i Reshka and works with the television channels Inter in Ukraine and Pyatnica! in Russia.

Early life
Krapivina was born in Ashgabat to an Azeri–Armenian family. Her father is Azerbaijani real estate developer Vagif Aliyev. Krapivina lived in Ashgabat until the age of eleven, later moving to Ukraine. In 2003, she graduated with a degree in international law from the Taras Shevchenko National University of Kyiv.

Career

TeenSpirit Studio
While at the institute, Krapivina created her own production studio, which she called "TeenSpirit". She later launched the travel show "Oryol i Reshka". Together with partners Helen Synelnykova and Yevgen Synelnykov, they created a novelty on the Russian-speaking segment of Ukrainian television. TeenSpirit studio is also engaged in the production of videos and TV programs, among which the most popular are "Vokrug M" with Lesia Nikituk and "Kitchen with Dmitry Shepelev".

LOBODA
In 2010, Krapivina met Ukrainian singer-songwriter Svetlana Loboda, and has since become her record producer.

Krapivina on working with Loboda:

Gadar
In partnership with Loboda and her sound producer Mikhail Koshevoy, Krapivina founded the music label BogArt, which released the first single by rapper Gadar, titled "Не плачь".

The collaboration between LOBODA and Gadar is seen as the beginning of a popularization of urban culture in Ukraine.

Projects

TeenSpirit Studio TV shows and TV projects
 "Oryol i Reshka" ("inter", "Pyatnica!", "K1")
 "Oryol i Reshka. Shopping" ("Inter", "Pyatnica!", "K1")
 "Vokrug M (Lesia Zdesia – in Russia)" ("Inter", "Pyatnica!")
 "Family dog" ("Inter")
 "Kitchen with Dmitry Shepelev" ("Inter")

TeenSpirit Studio films
 2016 – Oryol i Reshka. New year ("Pyatnica!")

Videography

2013
 Svetlana Loboda – "Кохана"

2014
 Svetlana Loboda – "Смотришь в небо" (feat. Emin)
 Nyusha – "Только" / "Don't You Wanna Stay"

2015
 Svetlana Loboda – "Не нужна", "Пора домой", "Облиш"

2016
 Svetlana Loboda – "К чёрту любовь", "Твои глаза"
 Gadar – "Не плачь"

2017

Awards and nominations

Television projects

Videos

References

1982 births
Living people
People from Ashgabat
Mass media people from Kyiv
Taras Shevchenko National University of Kyiv alumni
Ukrainian film directors
Ukrainian women film directors
Ukrainian film producers
Ukrainian women film producers
Ukrainian people of Armenian descent
Ukrainian people of Azerbaijani descent
Ukrainian record producers
Ukrainian women record producers